In mathematics, an eigenfunction of a linear operator D defined on some function space is any non-zero function  in that space that, when acted upon by D, is only multiplied by some scaling factor called an eigenvalue. As an equation, this condition can be written as

for some scalar eigenvalue  The solutions to this equation may also be subject to boundary conditions that limit the allowable eigenvalues and eigenfunctions.

An eigenfunction is a type of eigenvector.

Eigenfunctions
In general, an eigenvector of a linear operator D defined on some vector space is a nonzero vector in the domain of D that, when D acts upon it, is simply scaled by some scalar value called an eigenvalue. In the special case where D is defined on a function space, the eigenvectors are referred to as eigenfunctions. That is, a function f is an eigenfunction of D if it satisfies the equation

where λ is a scalar. The solutions to Equation  may also be subject to boundary conditions. Because of the boundary conditions, the possible values of λ are generally limited, for example to a discrete set λ1, λ2, … or to a continuous set over some range. The set of all possible eigenvalues of D is sometimes called its spectrum, which may be discrete, continuous, or a combination of both.

Each value of λ corresponds to one or more eigenfunctions. If multiple linearly independent eigenfunctions have the same eigenvalue, the eigenvalue is said to be degenerate and the maximum number of linearly independent eigenfunctions associated with the same eigenvalue is the eigenvalue's degree of degeneracy or geometric multiplicity.

Derivative example
A widely used class of linear operators acting on infinite dimensional spaces are differential operators on the space C∞ of infinitely differentiable real or complex functions of a real or complex argument t. For example, consider the derivative operator  with eigenvalue equation

Its solution, the exponential function

is the eigenfunction of the derivative operator, where f0 is a parameter that depends on the boundary conditions. Note that in this case the eigenfunction is itself a function of its associated eigenvalue λ, which can take any real or complex value. In particular, note that for λ = 0 the eigenfunction f(t) is a constant.

We then find that

where λ = 2 is the only eigenvalue of the differential equation that also satisfies the boundary condition.

Link to eigenvalues and eigenvectors of matrices
Eigenfunctions can be expressed as column vectors and linear operators can be expressed as matrices, although they may have infinite dimensions. As a result, many of the concepts related to eigenvectors of matrices carry over to the study of eigenfunctions.

Define the inner product in the function space on which D is defined as

integrated over some range of interest for t called Ω. The * denotes the complex conjugate.

Suppose the function space has an orthonormal basis given by the set of functions {u1(t), u2(t), …, un(t)}, where n may be infinite. For the orthonormal basis,

where δij is the Kronecker delta and can be thought of as the elements of the identity matrix.

Functions can be written as a linear combination of the basis functions,

for example through a Fourier expansion of f(t). The coefficients bj can be stacked into an n by 1 column vector . In some special cases, such as the coefficients of the Fourier series of a sinusoidal function, this column vector has finite dimension.

Additionally, define a matrix representation of the linear operator D with elements

We can write the function Df(t) either as a linear combination of the basis functions or as D acting upon the expansion of f(t),

Taking the inner product of each side of this equation with an arbitrary basis function ui(t),

This is the matrix multiplication Ab = c written in summation notation and is a matrix equivalent of the operator D acting upon the function f(t) expressed in the orthonormal basis. If f(t) is an eigenfunction of D with eigenvalue λ, then Ab = λb.

Eigenvalues and eigenfunctions of Hermitian operators
Many of the operators encountered in physics are Hermitian. Suppose the linear operator D acts on a function space that is a Hilbert space with an orthonormal basis given by the set of functions {u1(t), u2(t), …, un(t)}, where n may be infinite. In this basis, the operator D has a matrix representation A with elements

integrated over some range of interest for t denoted Ω.

By analogy with Hermitian matrices, D is a Hermitian operator if Aij = Aji*, or: 

Consider the Hermitian operator D with eigenvalues λ1, λ2, … and corresponding eigenfunctions f1(t), f2(t), …. This Hermitian operator has the following properties:
 Its eigenvalues are real, λi = λi*
 Its eigenfunctions obey an orthogonality condition,  if i ≠ j

The second condition always holds for λi ≠ λj. For degenerate eigenfunctions with the same eigenvalue λi, orthogonal eigenfunctions can always be chosen that span the eigenspace associated with λi, for example by using the Gram-Schmidt process. Depending on whether the spectrum is discrete or continuous, the eigenfunctions can be normalized by setting the inner product of the eigenfunctions equal to either a Kronecker delta or a Dirac delta function, respectively.

For many Hermitian operators, notably Sturm–Liouville operators, a third property is
 Its eigenfunctions form a basis of the function space on which the operator is defined

As a consequence, in many important cases, the eigenfunctions of the Hermitian operator form an orthonormal basis. In these cases, an arbitrary function can be expressed as a linear combination of the eigenfunctions of the Hermitian operator.

Applications

Vibrating strings

Let  denote the transverse displacement of a stressed elastic chord, such as the vibrating strings of a string instrument, as a function of the position  along the string and of time . Applying the laws of mechanics to infinitesimal portions of the string, the function  satisfies the partial differential equation

which is called the (one-dimensional) wave equation. Here  is a constant speed that depends on the tension and mass of the string.

This problem is amenable to the method of separation of variables. If we assume that  can be written as the product of the form , we can form a pair of ordinary differential equations:

This last boundary condition constrains  to take a value , where  is any integer. Thus, the clamped string supports a family of standing waves of the form

In the example of a string instrument, the frequency  is the frequency of the -th harmonic, which is called the -th overtone.

Schrödinger equation
In quantum mechanics, the Schrödinger equation

with the Hamiltonian operator

can be solved by separation of variables if the Hamiltonian does not depend explicitly on time. In that case, the wave function  leads to the two differential equations,

Both of these differential equations are eigenvalue equations with eigenvalue . As shown in an earlier example, the solution of Equation  is the exponential

Equation  is the time-independent Schrödinger equation. The eigenfunctions  of the Hamiltonian operator are stationary states of the quantum mechanical system, each with a corresponding energy . They represent allowable energy states of the system and may be constrained by boundary conditions.

The Hamiltonian operator  is an example of a Hermitian operator whose eigenfunctions form an orthonormal basis. When the Hamiltonian does not depend explicitly on time, general solutions of the Schrödinger equation are linear combinations of the stationary states multiplied by the oscillatory ,  or, for a system with a continuous spectrum,

The success of the Schrödinger equation in explaining the spectral characteristics of hydrogen is considered one of the greatest triumphs of 20th century physics.

Signals and systems
In the study of signals and systems, an eigenfunction of a system is a signal  that, when input into the system, produces a response , where  is a complex scalar eigenvalue.

See also
 Eigenvalues and eigenvectors
 Hilbert–Schmidt theorem
 Spectral theory of ordinary differential equations
 Fixed point combinator
 Fourier transform eigenfunctions

Notes

Citations

Works cited



External links
 More images (non-GPL) at Atom in a Box

Functional analysis